The Hofmann rearrangement (Hofmann degradation) is the organic reaction of a primary amide to a primary amine with one fewer carbon atom. The reaction involves oxidation of the nitrogen followed by rearrangement of the carbonyl and nitrogen to give an isocyanate intermediate. The reaction can form a wide range of products, including alkyl and aryl amines.

The reaction is named after its discoverer, August Wilhelm von Hofmann, and should not be confused with the Hofmann elimination, another name reaction for which he is eponymous.

Mechanism
The reaction of bromine with sodium hydroxide forms sodium hypobromite in situ, which transforms the primary amide into an intermediate isocyanate. The formation of an intermediate nitrene is not possible because it implies also the formation of a hydroxamic acid as a byproduct, which has never been observed. The intermediate isocyanate is hydrolyzed to a primary amine, giving off carbon dioxide.

Base abstracts an acidic N-H proton, yielding an anion.
The anion reacts with bromine in an α-substitution reaction to give an N-bromoamide.
Base abstraction of the remaining amide proton gives a bromoamide anion.
The bromoamide anion rearranges as the R group attached to the carbonyl carbon migrates to nitrogen at the same time the bromide ion leaves, giving an isocyanate.
The isocyanate adds water in a nucleophilic addition step to yield a carbamic acid (aka urethane).
The carbamic acid spontaneously loses CO2, yielding the amine product.

Variations
Several reagents can be substituted for bromine. Sodium hypochlorite, lead tetraacetate, N-bromosuccinimide, and (bis(trifluoroacetoxy)iodo)benzene can effect a Hofmann rearrangement.

The intermediate isocyanate can be trapped with various nucleophiles to form stable carbamates or other products rather than undergoing decarboxylation. In the following example, the intermediate isocyanate is trapped by methanol.

In a similar fashion, the intermediate isocyanate can be trapped by tert-butyl alcohol, yielding the tert-butoxycarbonyl (Boc)-protected amine.

The Hofmann Rearrangement also can be used to yield carbamates from α,β-unsaturated or α-hydroxy amides or nitriles from α,β-acetylenic amides in good yields (≈70%).

Applications
 In the preparation of anthranilic acid from phthalimide 
 Nicotinamide is converted into 3-Aminopyridine
 The symmetrical structure of α-phenyl propanamide does not change after Hofmann reaction.
 In the synthesis of gabapentin, beginning with the mono-amidation of 1,1-cyclohexane diacetic acid anhydride with ammonia to 1,1-cyclohexane diacetic acid mono-amide, followed by a Hofmann rearrangement

See also
 Beckmann rearrangement
 Curtius rearrangement
 Iodoform reaction
 Lossen rearrangement
 Schmidt reaction
 Weerman degradation

References

Bibliography
 
 

Rearrangement reactions
Degradation reactions
Name reactions